Cohnella thermotolerans is the type species of the bacterial genus Cohnella. It is Gram-positive, rod-shaped and endospore-forming, with type strain CCUG 47242T (=CIP 108492T =DSM 17683T).

References

Further reading

External links

LPSN
Type strain of Cohnella thermotolerans at BacDive -  the Bacterial Diversity Metadatabase

Paenibacillaceae